Landsupport (spelling: LANDSUPPORT) is a pilot consulting project funded by the European Union for land use for the near-natural modeling of different types and methods of land use while at the same time protecting the environment.

Project goal 
In the long term, sustainable use of the soil must be guaranteed in order to meet the needs of the world's population. The project brings together numerous universities, research institutions, companies and stakeholders with the aim of creating a web-based, free system to support practical agriculture and land users in making decisions about sustainable land use, environmental protection and agricultural use.

With the active participation of various and numerous stakeholders in and outside Europe, the consortium also aims at legislation at European level, based on scientific data that is processed and modeled in the system.

In the research framework program Horizon 2020, the project is organized under the direction of Fabio Terribile at the University of Naples Federico II.

Project Consortium 
The Landsupport consortium consists of the following partners:
University of Naples, Italy
ARIESPACE, Italy
Barcelona Supercomputing Center, Spain
University of Natural Resources and Life Sciences, Vienna, Austria
Consiglio Nazionale delle Ricerche, Italy
Crops for the Future, Malaysia
ICARDA, Tunisia
Institute of Advanced Studies, Hungary
Institute for Environmental Protection and Research, Italy
Rasdaman GmbH, Germany
Joint Research Center, European Commission
Regione Campania, Italy
University of Milan, Italy
Zala County, Hungary
CMAST / Modis, Belgium
Acteon, France
Federal Environment Agency, Austria
Slovenian Forestry Institute, Slovenia

Results and advice 
The results of the investigations are internationally evaluated by the members in specialist committees and made available to practice and the responsible bodies at regional and state level, as well as to the European Uninion for  legislative and approval procedures.

See also 
 Bioeconomy
 Biofector
 Edaphon
 Microbiology
 Pedology

External links 
 Webpage Landsupport
 Report of EU concerning Landsupport
 Balkan green Deal BW
 BeyondSoil Initiative of the University Hohenheim
 Greenerde.eu
 Scoalaagricola.eu
 Danube Strategy Baden-Württemberg
 Green Deal and Biodiversity in Europe

References 

Agroecology
Agronomy
Botany
.
Biology and pharmacology of chemical elements
.
Ecology
Ecological economics
Edaphology
Fertilizers
Organic fertilizers
Organic food
Recycling
Soil
Soil improvers
Sustainable agriculture
Sustainable gardening
Sustainable technologies
Systems ecology
Waste management